Faintheart is a 2008 British comedy film, directed by Vito Rocco and starring Eddie Marsan, Ewen Bremner and Jessica Hynes. It concerns a lead character involved in the historical reenactment of medieval battles; and is the first film to be created using active input from an online site.

The film was a result of collaborative effort from Myspace, Vertigo films and Film4. The resulting group, MyMovieMashUp, sought to harness the talents of the online community and to enable them to be involved in the film-making process. Various cast and crew members were picked from the MySpaceUK website to work on the project, a unique tactic in the film-making industry. Although the casting and soundtrack were assembled with the help of Myspace, the screenplay was written by UK-based writer David Lemon.

Professional Viking re-enactors from UK-based company "The Vikings" formed part of the cast alongside Britannia Romano-British society.
A specialist stunt team from East 15 Acting School took part in filming the large battles under the fight direction of Richard Ryan.

Plot
Richard is separated from his wife and son because she is tired of playing second fiddle to his medieval war re-enactments: The Broad Swords. He is trying desperately to win her back by recreating the atmosphere in which their relationship began, but she has moved on, and is dating the school gym teacher.

His son is equally geeky but blames his father for this, as it results in his being bullied at school.

Meanwhile, his gaming friend Julian, who owns a comic book store, is having his own romantic problems, but finds Maggie, a woman with an equal love of Star Trek: The Next Generation which sets him on the right track.

Richard has a lowly job in a DIY store and his manager has little sympathy either with his hobby or home problems.

After a heart to heart discussion with his "Viking" colleagues he has a change of heart. He cuts off his long hair. He apologises at the grave of his father-in-law where he meets his mother-in-law. But when his son's young girlfriend expresses an interest in watching the re-enactment he returns to his love, rescuing his swords from the dump.

His wife realises the gym teacher looks good but is ugly inside.

Richard joins in a huge public display battle between Vikings and Normans. The fight is side-lined by the gym teacher appearing, resulting in a duel between him and Richard. When the son intervenes his wife takes a bow and arrow and forces the teacher to retreat to the cheer of the crowds.

Romantic comedy concerning Richard and his efforts to win back his wife, whilst taking part in weekend re-enactments of Viking battles. At the same time he is bullied at work and his son is bullied at school because of his father's hobby.

Cast
 Eddie Marsan as Richard
 Ewen Bremner as Julian
 Jessica Hynes as Cath, Richard's wife
 Bronagh Gallagher as Maggie
 Tim Healy as Geoff
 Paul Nicholls as Gary
 Jodie Packwood as mischievous schoolgirl 
 Anne Reid as Barbara Wallace, Richard's mother-in-law
 Joseph Hamilton as Martin
 Chloe Hesar as Emily
 Richard Ridings as Collin
 Gary Sefton as Vince
 Kevin Eldon as Alan
 Sandra Voe as Julian's Mum
 Matthew Leighton as Kim
 Tom Smith as Danny
 Phil Lester as Tim
Oscar McDevitt as Pete
Rasmus Hardiker as Comic Book Fan 1
Edward Tudor-Pole as 	Lollipop Man / Death Metal Singer
Tim Potter as Headmaster
Aliese Kellner-Joyce as Office Worker
Colin Webb as Policeman
 George Hill as Boy With Owl
Chris R. Wright as Simon
Calum Chalmers as Kevin
Steve Ryland as Comic Book Fan 2
 Nick Ball as	Graham
Jason Excell as Death Metal Band Bassist
Graeme Brookes as	Pub Landlord
Joseph Ripley as Photographer
Rosalyn Scanlon as Office Worker

Critical reception
The Guardian gave the film two out of five stars, writing, "this is not a bad movie, exactly, but it aims curiously low, and is faintly pointless; and while the actors cope well with the material, they are finally just cardboard characters in a balsa-wood plot." Sky Movies gave the film four out of five stars, saying, "it's a totally unexpected hoot...Director Vito Rocco and credited writer David Lemon have done a terrific job in creating one of the most consistently funny and winning Brit-coms of recent years." The IGN review by Chris Tilly was positive.

References

Further reading
 https://web.archive.org/web/20080924225914/http://www.cambridgefilmfestival.org.uk/films/2008/faintheart/reviews/ (Reviews, Cambridge Film Festival)

External links

British comedy films
British romantic comedy films
Vertigo Films films
British independent films
2009 films
2000s English-language films
2000s British films